Roy Alton Young (March 1, 1921 – April 19, 2013) was an American scholar and academic administrator who served as chancellor of the University of Nebraska-Lincoln from 1976 to 1980 and as acting president of Oregon State University from 1969 to 1970.

Biography

Education
Young was born on March 1, 1921, in McAlister, New Mexico. He attended the New Mexico State University and received a bachelor's degree in Biology in 1936 and an M.S. degree in 1942 and a doctorate in 1948, both in Plant Pathology from Iowa State University.

Career
From 1942 to 1946, he was a lieutenant in the U.S. Navy, serving as a deck officer, navigator, antisubmarine warfare officer, and executive officer in the Atlantic and Pacific areas of operation. From 1946 to 1954, he served in the United States Navy Reserve and was promoted to the rank of lieutenant commander.
 
He was a faculty member and administrator at Oregon State University from 1948 to 1976. He served as a faculty member and chancellor at the University of Nebraska-Lincoln from 1976 to 1980. He was president and managing director of the prestigious Boyce Thompson Institute for Plant Research of Cornell University from 1980 to 1986.

References

1921 births
2013 deaths
New Mexico State University alumni
Iowa State University alumni
Oregon State University faculty
University of Nebraska–Lincoln faculty
Cornell University faculty
Chancellors of the University of Nebraska-Lincoln
Presidents of Oregon State University
United States Navy personnel of World War II